Claud Hamilton may refer to:

 Claud Hamilton, 1st Lord Paisley (1543–1621), Scottish politician
 Claud Hamilton of Shawfield (died 1614) Scottish landowner
 Claud Hamilton, 2nd Baron Hamilton of Strabane (1606–1638), Irish nobleman
 Claud Hamilton, 4th Earl of Abercorn (1659–1691), Irish and Scottish nobleman
 GER 'Claud Hamilton', a steam locomotive
 Lord Claud Hamilton (1787–1808), British nobleman and politician, son of the 1st Marquess of Abercorn
 Lord Claud Hamilton (1813–1884), British nobleman and politician, son of James Hamilton, Viscount Hamilton
 Lord Claud Hamilton (1843–1925), British Member of Parliament, son of the 1st Duke of Abercorn
 Lord Claud Hamilton (1889–1975), British soldier and courtier, Deputy Master of the Household, son of the 2nd Duke of Abercorn